Michael Woolson is an American acting coach, author, director, and founder of the Michael Woolson Studio in Los Angeles, California.

Coaching career
Michael Woolson began his career as an acting coach teaching at the Larry Moss Studio in 1999 after spending 10 years as a working actor. In 2001, Woolson built and founded the Michael Woolson Studio just outside Beverly Hills where he and his staff conduct classes, producing and directing theatrical productions.

Publications
Michael has published two books on acting: The Work of an Actor, an in depth guide in which he details acting techniques, and Emotion on Demand: An Actor’s Workbook for Mastering Emotional Triggers, a workbook that guides actors through exercises to achieve greater emotional connectivity.

Clients
Michael Woolson works with a range of clients, from talented up-and-comers to award-winning actors:
 JC Gonzalez
 Jeanine Mason
 Hailee Steinfeld attributes her Academy Award nominated performance in True Grit to Woolson's coaching.
 Buddy Handleson

References

External links 

Living people
American acting coaches
American directors
Year of birth missing (living people)
Place of birth missing (living people)